Sev puri is an Indian cuisine snack and a type of chaat. It is a speciality that originates from Pune, Maharashtra, India.
In Pune and Mumbai, sev puri is strongly associated with street food, but is also served at upscale locations. Recently, supermarkets have started stocking ready-to-eat packets of sev puri and similar snacks like bhelpuri.

Preparation
Although there is no fixed recipe for sev puri, the basic ingredients used widely are the same. Sev puri is essentially made of crispy papdi (flat puri) which is loaded with diced potatoes, chickpeas, onions and various types of chutneys. Some popular chutneys used include spicy mint, sweet-sour tamarind, chili and garlic. The filled puris are then topped with sev. It is seasoned with various spices and flavors, such as raw mango, ginger, anise, cumin, clove, and chaat masala.

Variations
Sev puri can be made with a variety of fillings and garnishing ingredients. Some popular variations are dahi sev puri, masala sev puri, corn masala puri, batata dahi sev puri (sev puri with dahi and potato), and palak sev puri (sev puri with spinach). Sometimes other chutneys and paneer are also added in its preparation.

References

Indian snack foods
Indian fast food
Culture of Mumbai
Street food